Stefan Majer (29 October 1929 – 5 August 2020) was a Polish professional basketball player and coach.

Awards

As a Player
Polish Basketball League Championship (1956, 1957)

As a Coach
Polish Basketball League Championship (1969)
Polish Basketball Cup Champion (1968, 1970)

References

1929 births
2020 deaths
Polish men's basketball players
Basketball players from Warsaw